Alford railway station is a former railway station in Alford, Aberdeenshire which now serves as a terminus for tourist narrow gauge railway, the Alford Valley Railway. The station used to be the terminus of a line, also called the Alford Valley Railway, from Kintore where it joined the Great North of Scotland Railway main line.

History
Opened by the Great North of Scotland Railway it became part of the London and North Eastern Railway during the Grouping of 1923, passing on to the Scottish Region of British Railways during the nationalisation of 1948. It was then closed by British Railways.

The site today
The station is now the terminus of the Alford Valley Railway. The northern part of the site, which was the former goods yard, was later redeveloped as the home of the Grampian Transport Museum.

Services

References

Notes

Sources
 
 
 
 Station on navigable O.S. map
 

Disused railway stations in Aberdeenshire
Railway museums in Scotland
Former Great North of Scotland Railway stations
Railway stations in Great Britain opened in 1859
Railway stations in Great Britain closed in 1950
1859 establishments in Scotland
1950 disestablishments in Scotland